The 1979 Yapen earthquake occurred on September 12 at 05:17:51 UTC. It had an epicenter near the coast of Yapen Island in Irian Jaya, Indonesia. At least 115 were killed due to shaking and a moderate tsunami.

Tectonic setting
The northern coast of New Guinea is situated in a region of east–west oblique plate convergence between the Australian and Pacific plates. The oceanic crust of the Pacific Plate subducts obliquely beneath New Guinea and nearby islands along the New Britain Trench and Manokwari Trough. A large component of this oblique convergence is accommodated by east–west left-lateral shear at a rate of 80 mm/yr. The Sorong, Koor, Ransiki and Yapen faults are the largest structures forming the shear zone.

Earthquake
The Yapen Fault is the fastest-slipping fault in the shear zone, estimated to move at a rate of  46 ± 12 mm/yr. It crosses east–west through Cenderawasih Bay. The total rupture length was  × . It was followed by an aftershock sequence trending east–west. A cluster of aftershocks occurred north of the mainshock, at Pandaidori, displayed reverse faulting. This aftershock sequence is thought to be triggered by stress transfer.

Damage
Shaking from the mainshock killed 15 people and demolished at least 1,000 homes. The tsunami killed at least 100 people on Yapen Island. A fisherman on Biak was among the fatalities after being swept away by the waves. In West Yapen District, 76 homes were destroyed and flooded by the tsunami. Many residents had to hold themselves onto stable objects during the shaking. Ground cracks occurred. Many churches and homes collapsed. In two villages, all homes were destroyed. In Menawi, 254 homes were seriously damaged. A further 90 homes and a school were destroyed at Randawaya II.

After the earthquake, local government officials in Jayapura were not notified about the earthquake due to a local event. It was only after news was transmitted to Garuda Indonesia in Sentani were they informed. The Indonesian Minister of Home Affairs appointed the Governor of Irian Jaya to respond immediately to the affected area. A total of 16,500 residents were displaced.

See also 
List of earthquakes in 1979
List of earthquakes in Indonesia

References

External links 

1979 earthquakes
Earthquake
Yapen Islands
Tsunamis in Indonesia
1979 in Indonesia
Papua (province)
Schouten Islands
Western New Guinea
1979 tsunamis